The Theban Tomb TT5 is located in  Deir el-Medina, part of the Theban Necropolis, on the west bank of the Nile, opposite to Luxor. It is the burial place of the ancient Egyptian artisan (his exact title was Servant in the Place of Truth) named Neferabet, who lived during the Ramesside period.

Neferabet (also called Neferabu) was the son of Neferronpet and Mahi. His wife was named Taesi (Ta-Iset).

Tomb
The tomb has two burial chambers. In chamber A a son named Nedjemger is shown offering a vase to Neferabet and Taesi. A large group of relatives is shown adoring the Hathor cow from the mountain. The relatives include: Neferabet himself, his "father" the scorpion curer Amenmose (father-in-law?), and his brother Amenemope. Also included are Neferabet's sons Neferronpet, Ramose, Nedjemger, Meriunu and Neferabets brothers Anhotep, Ipu, Huy, Merymaat and a man named Iryfdjodj. The women in the scene include Neferabet's wife Ta-ese, her mother Tenthaynu, his sister Istnofret and several daughters named Henuttu, Mahy, Tenthaynu, Hetepy, Mutemopet and Istnofret.

In another scene several family members are shown adoring Re-Harakhti. The relatives in this scene include Neferabet's father Neferronpet, Neferabet himself, Neferabet's brother Anhotep and several of Neferabet's uncles: Rahotep, Maaninakhtef, Ipu and Pashed.

In chamber B, five panels show the family adoring Anubis. Neferabet is accompanied by his wife, his sons Nedjemger, Neferronpet, Ramose, and Meriunu as well as his daughters Henutta, Tentha, Istnofret, Henut-iunet, Hetepy, Mutemopet, Mahy and Roruti. Anhotep is accompanied by their sisters Tentamenet and Ta(y)senofret.

Finds
A stele mentioning Neferabet's father Neferrenpet is now in the British Museum (BM 150)

A statuette from Neferabu's tomb is now at the National Museum of Archaeology.

See also
 List of Theban tombs

References

Buildings and structures completed in the 13th century BC
Theban tombs
13th-century BC establishments